Creobroter pictipennis, with the common name Indian flower mantis, is a species of praying mantis native to Asia.

Males grow to about 1.5 in long (3.8 cm) and females are slightly larger.

See also
List of mantis genera and species

References

P
Mantodea of Asia
Insects of India
Insects described in 1878